Zinc transporter ZIP8 is a cation/bicarbonate symporter protein which in humans is encoded by the SLC39A8 gene.

Function 

This transmembrane protein is responsible for the influx of zinc, manganese, iron, and cadmium. ZIP8 is distributed among the embryo, placenta, and yolk sac during development. Within the embryo, the concentration of ZIP8 is highest during the developmental period of different organ systems, specifically the heart where is it localized in the endothelial cells. Cardiac development is a zinc-dependent event. Beginning around mouse E8.0, the heart is in a tubular form with an outer myocardium layer and an inner endocardium layer, separated by cardiac jelly. As development continues, trabeculation, the protrusion of cardiomyocytes into the cardiac jelly, begins and facilitates nutrient and oxygen exchange prior to the establishment of coronary vessels. Simultaneous with coronary circulation development, the trabeculae then collapse into the ventricular wall in a process known as compaction. Cardiomyocyte differentiation, proliferation, and trabeculae patterning is regulated through Notch 1 signaling, which is upregulated by the ECM. ADAMTS 1, 5, 7, 15, and 19 are zinc metalloenzymes responsible for degrading the ECM prior to compaction. Many studies have analyzed the effects of Slc39a8-/- on fetal heart development and have shown a decrease in zinc influx leading to an increase in cardiomyocyte proliferation through BMP10, hypertrabeculation through the upregulation of Notch1, and ventricular non-compaction due to the persistence of the ECM.

References 

Genes
Solute carrier family